The Gobiiformes  are an order of fish that includes the gobies and their relatives. The order, which was previously considered a suborder of Perciformes, is made up of about 2,211 species that are divided between seven families. Phylogenetic relationships of the Gobiiformes have been elucidated using molecular data. Gobiiforms are primarily small species that live in marine water, but roughly 10% of these species inhabit fresh water. This order is composed chiefly of benthic or burrowing species; like many other benthic fishes, most gobiiforms do not have a gas bladder or any other means of controlling their buoyancy in water, so they must spend most of their time on or near the bottom.
Gobiiformes means "goby-like".

Families
The 5th Edition of the Fishes of the World reclassified the former superfamily Goboidei as the order Gobiiformes and also rearranged the families within the order compared to the previous edition. The largest change is that the Oxudercidae and the Gobiidae are split into two families, with the Oxudercidae containing the species formerly classified as the Gobiidae subfamilies Amblyopinae, Gobionellinae, Oxudercinae and Sicydiinae while merging the families Kraemeriidae, Microdesmidae, Ptereleotridae and Schindleriidae into the family Gobiidae, though no subfamilies within the Gobiidae were proposed.

Under this classification system the Gobiiformes is divided into the following families:

Rhyacichthyidae
The loach-gobies are a small family, with only three species split between two genera, which inhabits marine and fresh water in Oceania and the western Pacific.  These are thought to be among the more primitive species of the Gobiiformes.

Odontobutidae
The Odontobutidae, or freshwater sleepers, contains 22 species between 6 genera from eastern Asia. This family is the sister to all the other Gobiiformes in a clade with the Rhyacichthyidae.

Milyeringidae
The Milyeringidae contains two genera of cave fish, one in Western Australia and one at the other side of the Indian Ocean in Madagascar; both genera contain three recognized species. This family forms a second clade of the Gobiiformes.

Eleotridae
The sleeper gobies are a family of twenty six genera and 126 species found in freshwater and mangrove habitats throughout the tropical and temperate parts of the world as far north as the eastern United States and as far south as Stewart Island, New Zealand, except for the eastern Atlantic. Fossils of Eleotrid gobies are known from the Late Oligocene. The families Milyeringidae and Butidae were formerly classified as subfamilies of the Eleotridae but are not found to be close to the Eleotridae senus stricto in this system.

Butidae
The Butidae are one of the two families which are given the common name "sleeper gobies", and indeed were formerly classified as subfamily of the traditional sleeper goby family Eleotridae, although some phylogenies have placed them closer to the Oxucerdidae and the Gobiidae than to the Eleotridae. They are found in the Indo-Pacific and in West Africa, and contains 10 genera with 46 species split between them.

Thalasseleotrididae
The family Thalasseleotrididae is considered to be a sister group to the family Gobiidae and is separated as a family by the authors of this classification based on recent molecular studies. It comprises two genera of marine gobies from the temperate waters of Australia and New Zealand, with a total of three species between them.

Oxudercidae
Oxudercidae is a family of gobies comprising species previously split between four subfamilies of the family Gobiidae. The family is sometimes referred to as the Gobionellidae, but Oxucerdidae has priority. The species in this family have a cosmopolitan distribution in temperate and tropical areas and are found in marine and freshwater environments, typically in inshore, euryhaline areas with silt and sand substrates. The family contains 86 genera and about 600 species. Many species in this family can be found in fresh water and a number of species are found on wet beaches; some are able to survive for extended periods out of water, most famously the mudskippers.

Gobiidae
The Gobiidae as recognized in this classification now includes the former members of several families which other classifications have regarded as valid families. As classified in this work the family remains one of the most speciose families of marine fish, as well as being one of the most numerous groups of fishes in freshwater habitats on oceanic islands. Many species have fused pelvic fins that can be used as a suction device; some island species, such as the red-tailed stream goby (Lentipes concolor), are able to use these pelvic fins to ascend rock faces alongside waterfalls, allowing them to inhabit waters far from the ocean. Some of the species that are found in fresh water as adults spawn in the ocean and are catadromous, not unlike the eels of the family Anguillidae. With the blennies, the Gobiidae constitute a dominant part of the benthic, small fish fauna in tropical reef habitats. They are most diverse in the tropical Indo-West Pacific but the family is well represented in temperate waters in both the northern and southern hemispheres. They are mostly free living fishes found alone or in small schools, but some form associations with invertebrates, especially in coral reefs. About 120 species are known to form such symbiotic relationships; members of the genera Amblyeleotris and Cryptocentrus, for example, cohabit in burrows with alpheid shrimps, while other species live as cleaner fish, e.g Elacatinus. They can be sequential hermaphrodites and numerous species are known to exhibit parental care.

Species status
The tidewater goby (Eucyclogobius newberryi) was listed as an endangered species in 1994; it is the only species of goby in the genus Eucyclogobius. E. newberryi is native to the coastal region of California, in marshes and lagoons with brackish water, predominantly in waters where the salinity is less than 12 parts per thousand (ppt), but has been documented in waters with a salinity of 42 ppt. E. newberryi prefers water with mild temperatures (8 to 25 °C) and waters with a depth from 25 to 200 cm. These gobies often use thick patches of aquatic vegetation to hide in if threatened or disturbed. The average lifespan of E. newberryi is only one year. Spawning and reproduction is at its peak during spring and into late summer. However, in the southern region of its range where waters remain at a warmer temperature, E. newberryi will reproduce year round. The females lay between 300 and 500 eggs into a burrow dug out vertically by the male, which is 10 to 20 cm deep. Spawning locations are usually located out in the open away from any vegetation. The male then guards the eggs until they hatch, which is 9 to 11 days.

Habitat loss and modification are the main threats to E. newberryi. The brackish areas where saltwater and freshwater meet are where they live usually, such as along the coast of California; this area has been altered by development. Barriers such as dikes and levees have been built to protect residents from potential flooding, but the creation of these barriers has reduced habitat for E. newberryi. Other reasons for population declines are attributed to exotic fish and amphibians which have been introduced to the region. Many of these fish prey on E. newberryi, and others outcompete them for food and habitat. The altering of streams flow with diversions has affected the salinity of the water and changed the habitat at creek mouths where E. newberryi has historically lived. Restoration projects have been started to bring populations back to a more stable number by making more habitat available, as well as providing protective areas. Some levees have been removed and exotic species reduction programs are being initiated.

References

 
Percomorpha
Ray-finned fish orders
Taxa named by Albert Günther